Grand River Township is one of seventeen townships in Adair County, Iowa, USA.  As of the 2020 census, its population was 140.

History
Grand River Township was organized in 1855.

Geography
According to the USGS, it contains three cemeteries: Boley Farm, Grand River Center and Hebron.

References

External links
 US-Counties.com
 City-Data.com

Townships in Adair County, Iowa
Townships in Iowa
1855 establishments in Iowa
Populated places established in 1855